The busts of Paolo Giordano and Isabella Orsini are two sculptural portraits of the Duke of Bracciano (Paolo Giordano) and his wife Isabella Orsini. They were carried out by the Italian artist Gianlorenzo Bernini and members of his studio. Executed around 1635, the two sculptures remain in the Castello Orsini-Odescalchi in Bracciano, Italy.

See also
List of works by Gian Lorenzo Bernini

Notes

References

Further reading

External links

1630s sculptures
Marble sculptures in Italy
Busts by Gian Lorenzo Bernini